C. E. Crane (November 27, 1827May 8, 1898) was an American physician and politician.  He was the 17th and 19th Mayor of Green Bay, Wisconsin, and served as a surgeon for the Union Army in the American Civil War.

Biography
Crane was born on November 27, 1827, in Huron County, Ohio. He was raised in Erie County, Ohio, before moving to Norwalk, Ohio. Crane graduated from Western Reserve College and moved to Green Bay in 1849. Soon after, he opened a medical practice.

During the American Civil War, he served as surgeon for the 5th Wisconsin Volunteer Infantry Regiment in the Union Army.  The 5th Wisconsin was engaged in many of the critical battles of the eastern theater of the war, including Antietam, Fredericksburg, and Gettysburg.

After the war, he was one of the organizers of the Brown County Medical Society, and served as its president from 1868 to 1880.  Crane was elected Mayor of Green Bay five times, in 1874, 1875, 1877, 1878, and 1879. Additionally, he was president of the school board and a member of the board of health.  In 1879, he formed a partnership with Dr. Louis Carabin in Green Bay—Crane & Carabin, physicians and surgeons.  Their offices were located at 124 Washington Street.

In 1872, he married Louise Desnoyers, the daughter of Captain Thomas Beard (or Baird) and widow of former Green Bay mayor Francis X. Desnoyers. Crane died from throat cancer on May 8, 1898.

References

People from Norwalk, Ohio
People from Erie County, Ohio
School board members in Wisconsin
Mayors of Green Bay, Wisconsin
People of Wisconsin in the American Civil War
Union Army officers
Physicians from Wisconsin
Case Western Reserve University alumni
1827 births
1898 deaths
Deaths from cancer in Wisconsin
19th-century American politicians